The Western Congo worm lizard (Monopeltis guentheri) is a species of amphisbaenian in the family Amphisbaenidae. The species is endemic to the Democratic Republic of the Congo.

Etymology
The specific name, guentheri, is in honor of German-born British herpetologist Albert Günther.

Geographic range
M. guentheri is found in the western part of the Democratic Republic of the Congo.

Habitat
The preferred natural habitat of M. guentheri is forest.

Reproduction
The mode of reproduction of M. guentheri is unknown.

References

Further reading
Boettger O (1887). "Diagnoses Reptilium Novorum ab ill. viro Paul Hesse in finibus fluminis Congo repertorum ". Zoologischer Anzeiger 10: 649–651. (Monopeltis boulengeri, new species, p. 649). (in Latin).
Boudzoumou S, Hoops D, Mamonekene V, Jackson K (2013). "Morphologogical variation in Monopeltis guentheri from forest habitat in Brazzaville, Republic of Congo (Squamata: Amphisbaenidae)" African Journal of Herpetology 62 (2): 117–124. (in English, with an abstract in French).
Boulenger GA (1885). Catalogue of the Lizards in the British Museum (Natural History). Second Edition. Volume II. ... Amphisbænidæ. London: Trustees of the British Museum (Natural History). (Taylor and Francis, printers). xiii + 497 pp. + Plates I–XXIV. (Monopeltis guentheri, new species, pp. 456–457 + Plate XXIV, figures 3a–3d).
Gans C (2005). "Checklist and Bibliography of the Amphisbaenia of the World". Bulletin of the American Museum of Natural History (129): 1–130. (Monopeltis guentheri, p. 35).
Gans, Carl; Latifi, "Mahmood" (1971). "Redescription and Geographical Variation of Monopeltis guentheri Boulenger (Amphisbaenia, Reptilia)". American Museum Novitates (2464): 1–20.

Monopeltis
Endemic fauna of the Democratic Republic of the Congo
Reptiles of the Democratic Republic of the Congo
Reptiles described in 1885
Taxa named by George Albert Boulenger
Western Congolian forest–savanna mosaic